Aldebaran is the brightest star in the constellation Taurus.

Aldebaran may also refer to:

Geography and geology
 Aldebaran Rock, conspicuous nunatak of bright red rock, located near the head of Bertram Glacier, Antarctica
 Aldebaranium, alternative name for the element Ytterbium

Military and technology
 Aldebaran (rocket), airborne micro launcher
 , a US navy ship
 Italian ship Aldebaran, several ships

Entertainment
 Aldebaran (film), a 1935 Italian drama film
 Worlds of Aldebaran (aka "Aldebaran"), a Franc-Belgian science fiction comic book series  by Luiz Eduardo de Oliveira
 Aldebaran (comics), a graphic novel within the comic book series

Music
 "Aldebaran" (song), a song by Japanese-American singer Ai
 "Aldebaran", a song by Irish singer Enya from her album Enya
 "Aldebaran", a movement from Olivier Messiaen's Des Canyons aux étoiles

Fictional elements
 Aldebaran, a city within the game Ragnarok Online
 Aldebaran (Re:Zero), a character in the light novel series Re:Zero − Starting Life in Another World 
 Taurus Aldebaran, a character of the Saint Seiya manga/anime

Other uses
 Aldebaran Robotics, makers of the Nao robot

See also